Anton Schimser (19 February 1790–5 August 1838) was a Polish sculptor of Austrian origin, and founder of a family of stonemasons in Lviv.

Schimser arrived in Lviv in 1812, his brother Johann Baptist (1793-1856) in 1826. After the death of Johann, Schimser took over the family business with his son Leopold (1833-1888) and after the death of hid spouse Victoria Schimser (1838-1908).

Anton Schimser studied at the Academy of Fine Arts Vienna and at the École nationale supérieure des Beaux-Arts in Paris. After graduation, he stayed in Rome and Bratislava. His work was influenced creatively by Antonio Canova. In 1812 he settled in Lviv, where he established a sculpture studio in which he worked alone, then with his brother Johann. Since 1820 has worked with the sculptor Hartman Witwer (1774-1825). He was carving tombstone, mainly in the Lychakiv Cemetery, but also in cemeteries in and around Lviv, and also sculptural design houses and public buildings. In 1833 unsuccessfully applied for the post of lecturer of sculpture in the Academy of Fine Arts.

References
 S. S. Nicieja, Łyczakowski Cemetery in Lviv in the years 1786–1986, ed. 2 Am, Wrocław 1989
 S. S. Nicieja, Garden sleep and memory. This Łyczakowski Cemetery in Lviv and people resting there in the years 1786–2010, Opole 2010, 
 Yuri Biriulow, Sculpture Lviv since the mid-eighteenth century until 1939: Since the announcement of the avant-garde classical, Warsaw: "Neriton" 2007, p. 37-46. 

1790 births
1838 deaths
Artists from Vienna
Austrian sculptors
Austrian male sculptors
Polish sculptors
Polish male sculptors